Tang Behdaneh is a village in Jolgah Rural District, in the Central District of Jahrom County, Fars Province, Iran. At the 2016 census, its population was 20, in 4 families.

References 

Populated places in Jahrom County